Construction mechanic (abbreviated as CM) is a  United States Navy occupational rating.

Construction mechanics perform tasks involved in maintenance, repair and overhaul of automotive, materials handling and construction equipment; assign and supervise activities of assistants who locate, analyze and correct malfunctions in equipment and issue repair parts; maintain records; prepare requisitions and reports; train assistants in repair procedures and techniques; maintain individual combat readiness and perform tasks required in combat and disaster preparedness or recovery operations. 

At the master chief petty officer level, they merge with all other construction ratings as a master chief seabee (abbreviated as CBCM).

References

See also
List of United States Navy ratings

Mechanics (trade)
United States Navy ratings